"Caesar" is a song by the English band I Blame Coco from their debut album, The Constant. Produced by Klas Åhlund, the track features Swedish singer Robyn and was released as the album's lead single on 31 January 2010. The accompanying music video, directed by directing duo Hope Audikana, was uploaded onto Island Records' official YouTube account on 17 December 2009.

Critical reception
In a review for Digital Spy, Nick Levine called the song "quite a debut", stating that "Coco displays oodles of moody 'tude, referencing Lord Of The Flies and hissing lines like 'You're all f**king hopers', Ahlund keeps the production as lean and fuzzy as an undernourished duckling, and Robyn herself turns up to deliver the ear-snagging chorus." Joe O'Sullivan from This Is Fake DIY commented that "[t]he verse / chorus trade off between Coco and Robyn works very well, the contrast in their voices utilised to great effect as Robyn's impassioned singing is offset from Coco's by disinterested then snarling turns of We're going to knock down the walls, knock down the walls as the end of the chorus approaches." Ian Gittins from Virgin Media described "Caesar" as "fantastic sub-Gaga electro-brat-pop and, most importantly, big fun." NME critic Alex Denney referred to the song as a "good-ass pop tune", whilst both Heather Phares of Allmusic and Louisa Emery of The Wharf noted it as a standout on The Constant.

Track listings
UK iTunes EP
"Caesar" – 3:39
"Caesar" (Miike Snow Remix) – 3:50
"Ritalin" (Acoustic Demo) – 2:02

UK 10" single
A1. "Caesar" – 3:39
A2. "Ritalin" (Acoustic Demo) – 2:02
B1. "Caesar" (Miike Snow Remix) – 3:50

Release history

References

2010 debut singles
I Blame Coco songs
Robyn songs
Songs written by Klas Åhlund
2009 songs
Island Records singles